Munificentissimus Deus is the name of an apostolic constitution written by Pope Pius XII. It defines ex cathedra the dogma of the Assumption of the Blessed Virgin Mary. It was the first ex-cathedra infallible statement since the official ruling on papal infallibility was made at the First Vatican Council (1869–1870). In 1854 Pope Pius IX made an infallible statement with Ineffabilis Deus on the Immaculate Conception of the Virgin Mary, which was a basis for this dogma. The decree was promulgated on 1 November 1950.

Dogma of the Assumption

On 1 November 1950, invoking his dogmatic authority, Pope Pius XII defined the dogma:

Historical background
Pope Pius XII's previous encyclical  (1 May 1946) to all Catholic bishops stated that for a long time past, numerous petitions had been received from cardinals, patriarchs, archbishops, bishops, priests, religious of both sexes, associations, universities and innumerable private persons, all begging that the bodily Assumption into heaven of the Blessed Virgin should be defined and proclaimed as a dogma of faith. This was also fervently requested by almost two hundred fathers in the Vatican Council (1869–1870).

Following the example of Pope Pius IX, who canvassed Catholic bishops before proclaiming the dogma of the Immaculate Conception, Pius XII asked all bishops for their opinion.

At issue was not the belief in the Assumption, but its dogmatisation. By August 1950, 1191 bishops had responded.  reports popular acclaim and "nearly unanimous" approval of the contemporary bishops. The names of the bishops attending the dogma celebration in 1950 are listed at the entrance of St. Peter's Basilica.

Review of Catholic beliefs
Reflecting on the history of this belief in Catholic Christian tradition, Pope Pius XII writes that "the holy Fathers and Doctors of the Church have never failed to draw enlightenment from this fact."  reviews the history of Catholic liturgy and the many liturgical books "which deal with the feast either of the Dormition or of the Assumption of the Blessed Virgin".  cites also the teaching of previous popes and bishops and such writers as John of Damascus, Francis de Sales, Robert Bellarmine, Anthony of Padua, and Albert the Great, among others.

George Tavard wrote: "In the theology of Pope Pius XII, the Assumption of Mary's body and soul into heaven flow from her Immaculate Conception. The end balances the beginning, both having their profound reason in Mary's mission as the Theotokos."

Relevance to the faithful
Written not long after the devastation of World War II, the encyclical conveys the hope that meditation on Mary’s assumption will lead the faithful to a greater awareness of our common dignity as the human family. 
In the dogmatic statement, the phrase "having completed the course of her earthly life" was carefully written to leave open the question of whether or not Mary died before her Assumption, or whether, like the Assumption of the Prophet Elijah, Mary was assumed before death; both possibilities are allowed in the formulation. In articles 14, 17 and 20 of the dogmatic pronouncement, however, it is stated that Mary had indeed died: "the dead body of the Blessed Virgin Mary remained incorrupt, but ... she gained a triumph out of death, her heavenly glorification after the example of her only begotten Son, Jesus Christ."

The entire decree (and the title itself) is also worded to suggest that Mary's Assumption was not in any sense a logical necessity, but rather a divine gift to Mary as Mother of God.  teaches that Mary lived and completed her life as a shining example to the human race. The gift of her assumption is offered to all the faithful and signifies what to hope for at the end of time. Her assumption signifies God's intention to all the faithful.

Non-Catholic opinion

Paul Tillich asked fellow Protestant theologian Reinhold Niebuhr in March 1950, about eight months before the decree was promulgated, if he expected the Pope to make the declaration about Mary's assumption . Niebuhr replied: "I don't think so; he is too clever for that; it would be a slap in the face of the whole modern world and it would be dangerous for the Roman Church to do that today".

Among the Eastern Orthodox and miaphysite Copts, Armenians, Ethiopians, Eritreans, the doctrine of the Dormition of the Theotokos is different from the Assumption.

Carl Jung, in the final chapters of his 1952 book Answer to Job, called the dogma "the most important religious event since the Reformation". He chastized its Protestant critics for overlooking its real psychological significance. Namely, Jung saw it as the manifestation of a culminating desire for completion in the Christian psyche; recognizing the feminine side of the divine would ease the inevitable incarnation of the Holy Ghost in humanity.

See also
Assumption of Mary
Dormition of the Theotokos
Papal infallibility
Marian papal encyclicals and Apostolic Letters

References

Further reading 
Literature before the definition
 Pope Pius XII, Apostolic Constitution, Munificentissimus Deus Defining the Dogma of the Assumption, Acta Apostolicae Sedis, vol. XXXXII (1950), n. 15, pp. 753–773
 C. Balic, Bibliotheca de Assumptione BVM ex Omnibus Saeculis, Rome, 1948, 2 Volumes
 Otto Faller, De Priorum Saeculorum Silentio circa Assumptionem BMV, Rome, 1946
 G. Hentrich et R.G.de Moos, Petitiones de Assumptione Corpora BVM in Caelum Definiendae ad S.Sedem Delatae, Vatican City, 1944; 2 Volumes
 G. Hentrich, Assomption de la Sainte Vierge, in Manoir, I, pp 621–658
 J.M. Bover, La Asuncion de Maria, Estudio teologico historico, Madrid, 1947
 J. Ernst, Die leibliche Himmelfahrt Mariens, Paris 1925

External links
 Apostolic Constitution Munificentissimus Deus (Complete text on the Vatican website)

20th-century Christian texts
Pope Pius XII apostolic constitutions and bulls
Catholic theology and doctrine
Latin texts
Pope Pius XII Mariology
1950 documents
1950 in Christianity
Entering heaven alive